Agonopterix bipunctosa is a moth of the family Depressariidae. It is found in Great Britain, France, Sweden, Poland, Latvia and Russia.

The wingspan is 18–22 mm. Adults are on wing from July to September.

The larvae feed on  Serratula tinctoria. They feed in spun shoots and rolled leaves of their host plant. Larvae can be found from May to June.

References

External links
lepiforum.de

Moths described in 1850
Agonopterix
Moths of Europe